Alma Louise Taylor (3 January 1895 – 23 January 1974) was a British actress.

Life 

Taylor was born in London. She made her first screen appearance as a child actor in the 1907 film His Daughter's Voice. She went on to appear in more than 150 film roles, appearing in a number of larger-budget films such as Shadow of Egypt which was shot on location in Egypt in 1924. Taylor was one of the major British stars of the 1910s and early 1920s. In 1915 she was voted the most popular British performer by readers of Pictures and the Picturegoers, comfortably beating Charlie Chaplin into second place.

She acted only occasionally after 1932, appearing in films such as Lilacs in the Spring, Blue Murder at St Trinian's, and A Night to Remember during the 1950s. 
On television, she started twice in Armchair Theatre, in 1957: she played Mrs. Castor and Greta Stenbourg.

She died in London at the age of 79.

Selected filmography

 Oliver Twist (1912) as Nancy
 Adrift on Life's Tide (1913)
 David Copperfield (1913)
 The Cloister and the Hearth (1913)
 Justice (1914)
 The Heart of Midlothian (1914)
 The Old Curiosity Shop (1914)
 The Baby on the Barge (1915)
 The Golden Pavement (1915)
 The Man Who Stayed at Home (1915)
 Sweet Lavender (1915)
 The Bottle (1915)
 Molly Bawn (1916)
 The Marriage of William Ashe (1916)
 Trelawny of the Wells (1916)
 Sowing the Wind (1916)
 The Grand Babylon Hotel (1916)
 Annie Laurie (1916)
 The American Heiress (1917)
 Nearer My God to Thee (1917)
 The Touch of a Child (1918)
 The Leopard's Spots (1918)
 A New Version (1918)
 Boundary House (1918)
 The Forest on the Hill (1919)
 Broken in the Wars (1919)
 Sunken Rocks (1919)
 Sheba (1919)
 The Nature of the Beast (1919)Alf's Button (1920)
 Helen of Four Gates (1920)
 Mrs. Erricker's Reputation (1920)
 The Narrow Valley (1921)
 Tansy (1921)
 The Tinted Venus (1921)
 Dollars in Surrey (1921)
 The Pipes of Pan (1923)
 Strangling Threads (1923)
 Comin' Thro the Rye (1923)
 Mist in the Valley (1923)
 Strangling Threads (1923)
 Shadow of Egypt (1924)
 The House of Marney (1926)
 Quinneys (1927)
 Two Little Drummer Boys (1928)
 A South Sea Bubble (1928)
 The Night of Terror (1929)
 The Hound of the Baskervilles (1929)
 Things Are Looking Up (1935)
 Everybody Dance (1936)
 Lilacs in the Spring (1954)
 Stock Car (1955)
 Lost (1956)
 The Man Who Knew Too Much (1956 film) (1956)
 Blue Murder at St Trinian's (1957)
 A Night to Remember (1958)

Bibliography
 Babington, Bruce. British stars and stardom: from Alma Taylor to Sean Connery. Manchester University Press, 2001.

References

External links

1895 births
1974 deaths
English child actresses
English silent film actresses
Actresses from London
20th-century English actresses